Cerezal de Peñahorcada is a village and municipality in the province of Salamanca,  western Spain, part of the autonomous community of Castile and León.

References

Municipalities in the Province of Salamanca